Oostvoorne is a town in the Dutch province of South Holland.

The statistical area "Oostvoorne", which also can include the peripheral parts of the village, as well as the surrounding countryside, has a population of around 7,270.

Oostvoorne was a separate municipality until 1980, when it became part of Westvoorne.

Oostvoorne was since before World War II the only location in the Netherlands where automobiles were permitted on the beach. In 1992 it was proposed to close the beach to cars resulting in consultations and negotiations lasting many years. The provincial government finally decided to close it permanently on October 15, 2004.

In the center of Oostvoorne are the ruins of the Burcht of Voorne, one of the few Dutch castles still visibly situated on top of a motte. It was built shortly after 1200 by the Lords of Voorne. It also served as a residence for Jacqueline, Countess of Hainaut (Jacoba van Beieren).

Sport

Cycling
Since 1985 Oostvoorne has been organizing the Profronde van Oostvoorne, an elite men's and women's professional road bicycle racing criterium.

Notable people born in Oostvoorne
Belinda Meuldijk, actress, writer, and activist

References

Populated places in South Holland
Former municipalities of South Holland
Voorne aan Zee